Melanopais gemmaria is a species of beetle in the family Cerambycidae, and the only species in the genus Melanopais. It was described by White in 1856.

References

Tragocephalini
Beetles described in 1856